Niels Viggo Ussing (14 June 1864 – 23 July 1911), Professor of Mineralogy, University of Copenhagen, Denmark. The mineral ussingite is named after this Professor.

References 
 Ussingite: Ussingite mineral information and data.
 Polytech Photos - Scientific photodatabase

External links 
 Beskrivelse til geologisk kort over Danmark, (i maalestok 1) By Niels Viggo Ussing, Victor Christian Madsen
 Niels Viggo Ussing - Pedigree Chart

1864 births
1911 deaths
Academic staff of the University of Copenhagen
Danish mineralogists